There are two species of skink named Ousima skink:

 Plestiodon marginatus
 Plestiodon oshimensis